V. C. Harris was an Indian film director, film and literary critic, and university professor.

Harris was born in Mahé in 1958. After completing his secondary education at Jawaharlal Nehru Government Higher Secondary School, he began his undergraduate course at S. N. College, Kannur, followed by postgraduate studies at the English Department of the University of Calicut. Afterwards he worked as lecturer of English at Farook College, Calicut, and later as Director of the School of Letters at the Mahatma Gandhi University, Kerala.

On 5 October 2017, Harris was involved in an accident, and was admitted to the Government Medical College, Kottayam hospital, where he died four days later on 9 October 2017.

References

External links
VC – The lone tree, An interview by Jayakumar for Madhyamam weekly

Indian film critics
Malayalam literary critics
Malayalam film directors
1958 births
2017 deaths